Singin' Again is the second collaborative studio album by American country music singers Ernest Tubb and Loretta Lynn. It was released on May 29, 1967, by Decca Records.

Critical reception

In the issue dated June 17, 1967, Billboard published a review of the album which called the album "A welcome, winning album return for a winning duet, as Loretta Lynn and Ernest Tubb again join forces in a first rate collection, beginning with their hit "Sweet Thang". "Bartender" is a fine collaboration. "We'll Never Change" and "Yearning" are among the 10 other standouts."

Cashbox published a review in the June 10, 1967 issue that said, "Once again Ernest Tubb and Loretta Lynn have combined their great talents, and the result is a powerhouse package that’s sure to make a speed climb up the charts. Included in the set are "Sweet Thang", "Let’s Stop Right Where We Are", "I’m Bitin' My Fingernails and Thinkin' of You", "Yearning", and eight others. Stock as much as you can get of this one."

Commercial performance 
The album peaked at No. 2 on the US Billboard Hot Country Albums chart.

The album's only single, "Sweet Thang", was released in January 1967 and peaked at No. 45 on the US Billboard Hot Country Singles chart.

Recording
Recording sessions for the album took place at Columbia Recording Studio in Nashville, Tennessee, on December 21 and 27, 1966. One additional recording session was held on January 4, 1967.

Track listing

Personnel
Adapted from the album liner notes and Decca recording session records.
Owen Bradley – producer
Steve Chapman – guitar
Buddy Charleton – steel guitar
Jack Drake – bass
Jack Greene – drums
Kelso Herston – bass
Loretta Lynn – lead vocals
Hargus Robbins – piano
Cal Smith – guitar
Ernest Tubb – lead vocals
Pete Wade – guitar
Teddy Wilburn – liner notes

Charts
Album

Singles

References 

1967 albums
Loretta Lynn albums
Ernest Tubb albums
Vocal duet albums
Albums produced by Owen Bradley
Decca Records albums